Bird Skin Coat is a book of poetry by Angela Sorby published in 2009. It won the 2009 Brittingham Prize in Poetry, judged by Marilyn Nelson.

References

Angela Sorby

American poetry collections